The UK Rock & Metal Albums Chart is a record chart which ranks the best-selling rock and heavy metal albums in the United Kingdom. Compiled and published by the Official Charts Company, the data is based on each album's weekly physical sales, digital downloads (since 2007) and streams (since 2015), and is currently published every Friday. The chart was first published on 9 October 1994, when American thrash metal band Slayer was number one with its sixth studio album Divine Intervention.

As of the chart published for the week ending 3 November 2022, a total of 660 albums have topped the UK Rock & Metal Albums Chart. 14 artists have topped the chart with seven or more different albums. The most successful is American pop punk band Green Day, who have reached number one with 14 different albums and spent 74 weeks atop the chart. Four artists have topped the chart with ten or more releases: Iron Maiden with 12, Metallica with 11, and both Foo Fighters and Led Zeppelin with ten each.

Artists
The following artists have been credited on at least seven different number one albums, as recognised by the OCC. Appearances on compilation albums featuring various artists are not included.

See also
List of artists by number of UK Rock & Metal Singles Chart number ones
List of artists by number of UK Albums Chart number ones
List of artists by number of UK Singles Chart number ones

References

External links
Official UK Rock & Metal Albums Chart Top 40 at the Official Charts Company
The Official UK Top 40 Rock Albums at BBC Radio 1

Lists of artists by record chart achievement